The Smoky Range,  el. , is a small mountain range northeast of Whitefish in Flathead County, Montana, United States.

See also
 List of mountain ranges in Montana

Notes

Mountain ranges of Montana
Landforms of Flathead County, Montana